Godarpahan and Godar Pahn may refer to:

Godar Pahn, Hamadan
Godar Pahn, Khuzestan
Godarpahan, Lorestan